John Guerrasio is an American, New York born stage, film and TV actor, based in London, England.  He is known for having a broad New York accent.  In his review of Love Birds, Bernie Byrnes of Loose-Lips.com wrote, "John Guerrasio is ideal casting….He delivers his role with expert timing and rules the stage."

Career

Theatre

United Kingdom

New York

Film and Television

Video Games

References

1950 births
20th-century American male actors
21st-century American male actors
Male actors from London
Male actors from New York (state)
American expatriate male actors in the United Kingdom
American male film actors
American male television actors
Living people
American emigrants to England